Francis Hall (by 1476 – 14 August 1534) was an English politician.

He was a Member (MP) of the Parliament of England for Grantham in 1529.

References

15th-century births
1534 deaths
English MPs 1529–1536